Calderwood may refer to:

Places
 Almondell and Calderwood Country Park, a park in West Lothian, Scotland
 Calderwood, a housing development near East Calder in West Lothian, Scotland 
 Calderwood, East Kilbride, an area of East Kilbride, Scotland
 Calderwood Dam, a reservoir and dam development project in Tennessee, United States 
 Calderwood, Tennessee, a community once located near Calderwood Dam
 Calderwood, Michigan, a community in Michigan, United States 
 Calderwood, Eastern Cape, a town in South Africa
 Calderwood, New South Wales, a suburb of Wollongong, Australia
 Calderwood Park, a conservation area in Mashonaland East, Zimbabwe

Other uses
 Calderwood (surname)